Marsh River may refer to:

Marsh River (Maine), a tributary of the Sheepscot River
Marsh River (Minnesota), a tributary of the Red River of the North